Gail Whitsett is a former member of the Oregon House of Representatives representing District 56 including Klamath Falls and surrounding sections of southern Klamath County and southern Lake County, Oregon. She is married to Doug Whitsett, a veterinarian who formerly served as a member of the Oregon State Senate. Gail was his chief of staff before being elected to office. The couple owns farmland in the Klamath Basin where they raise horses. They have been involved in policy negotiations over water issues.

Whitsett won the 2012 Republican nomination over Tracey Liskey. Whitsett opposes the Klamath Basin Restoration Agreement and the precedent it establishes for removing dams. She served on the Agriculture and Natural Resources Committee, Energy and Environment Committee and Human Services and Housing Committee.
 She is a geologist with Bachelor of Science and Master of Science degrees from Oregon State University.

References

Living people
Politicians from Klamath Falls, Oregon
Republican Party members of the Oregon House of Representatives
American state police officers
Year of birth missing (living people)
21st-century American politicians